Paul Harries (born 20 October 1977) is an Australian footballer who played professionally in England.

References

External links
 Harries at Exeter City archive

Australian soccer players
Portsmouth F.C. players
Basingstoke Town F.C. players
Crystal Palace F.C. players
Torquay United F.C. players
Carlisle United F.C. players
Macclesfield Town F.C. players
Exeter City F.C. players
English Football League players
1977 births
Living people
Association football forwards
Wollongong Wolves FC players
Expatriate footballers in England
Australian expatriate soccer players
Australian expatriate sportspeople in England